Kendal was a parliamentary borough centred on the town of Kendal in Westmorland.  It returned one Member of Parliament (MP) to the House of Commons of the Parliament of the United Kingdom, elected by the first past the post system.

History
The constituency was created by the Reform Act 1832 for the 1832 general election, and abolished for the 1918 general election.

The small Kendal parliamentary borough constituency created in 1832 was abolished in 1885 by the Reform Act 1884. James Cropper, Liberal, being its last MP.  The constituency after 1885 was a result of dividing the Westmorland constituency which up to then had two members since 1297. Thereafter it was the Kendal Division of Westmorland and the other being the Appleby Division. The two Conservative members for the old constituency William Lowther and the Earl of Bective were reelected in the 1885 general election, Mr Lowther for the Appleby Division and the Earl of Bective for the Kendal Division. These two constituencies were recombined under one member John Wakefield Weston for the 1918 general election.

Members of Parliament

Elections

Elections in the 1830s

Brougham's death caused a by-election.

Elections in the 1840s

Wood's death caused a by-election.

Elections in the 1850s

Elections in the 1860s

Elections in the 1870s

Elections in the 1880s 

Whitwell's death caused a by-election.

Elections in the 1890s

Elections in the 1900s

Elections in the 1910s 

General Election 1914–15:

Another General Election was required to take place before the end of 1915. The political parties had been making preparations for an election to take place and by the July 1914, the following candidates had been selected; 
Unionist: John Weston
Liberal: William Somervell

References 

 Bulmer's Directory of Westmorland 1885

Parliamentary constituencies in North West England (historic)
Constituencies of the Parliament of the United Kingdom established in 1832
Constituencies of the Parliament of the United Kingdom disestablished in 1918
History of Westmorland